Canelles is a locality located in the municipality of Fígols i Alinyà, in Province of Lleida province, Catalonia, Spain. As of 2020, it has a population of 4.

Geography 
Canelles is located 116km northeast of Lleida.

References

Populated places in the Province of Lleida